The Girl Who Couldn't Quite is a 1950 British drama film directed by Norman Lee and starring Bill Owen, Elizabeth Henson and Iris Hoey. It is based on a play by Leo Marks, with its title thought up during a conversation he had with Noor Inayat Khan.

It cost an estimated £50,000 to make.

Cast
 Bill Owen – Tim
 Elizabeth Henson – Ruth
 Iris Hoey – Janet
 Betty Stockfeld – Pamela
 Stuart Lindsell – John Pelham
 Vernon Kelso – Paul Evans
 Rose Howlett – Rosa
 Fred Groves – Tony
 Charles Paton – Vicar

References

External links

1950 films
1950 drama films
1950s English-language films
Films directed by Norman Lee
British drama films
British black-and-white films
1950s British films